Hendrik (Henno) Mentz (born 25 September 1979 in Ermelo, Mpumalanga, South Africa) is a former South African rugby union player who represented the Sharks, Leopards and Lions as well as the South African national team, Springboks at first-class level. Mentz played predominantly on the wing throughout his career. This was a large contribution to the 31-20 victory that the Lions achieved against the Reds.

In the early days of his Super rugby career, Mentz set the competition (at the time, the Super12) alight, however Mentz followed this with a poor Currie Cup. Mentz's career took a further hit when he suffered a hamstring injury which put him out of contention for the 2005 Sharks Super 12 squad.

Mentz was capped twice by South Africa in 2004. He played against Ireland in Bloemfontein and his second and final test was in Pretoria against Wales. In 2005 Mentz was the ABSA Currie Cups' leading try-scorer crossing the whitewash 13 times for the Sharks. Henno Mentz's brother, MJ Mentz is an experienced SA Sevens representative and currently plies his trade with the Pumas. Henno Mentz scored an impressive 72 tries in 149 first-class matches, of which he scored 31 of those in 65 provincial matches for Natal.

References

External links
Lions profile

1979 births
Living people
People from Ermelo, Mpumalanga
Afrikaner people
South African rugby union players
South Africa international rugby union players
Golden Lions players
Lions (United Rugby Championship) players
Sharks (Currie Cup) players
Sharks (rugby union) players
Leopards (rugby union) players
Rugby union wings
Rugby union players from Mpumalanga